Yulin is a town under the administration of Lanxi County, Heilongjiang, China. , it has 8 villages under its administration.

References 

Township-level divisions of Heilongjiang
Lanxi County